The Minister of Economic Development is a Minister in the Cabinet of South Africa. Effective from 29 May 2019, the Ministry of Economic Development has been amalgamated with the Ministry of Trade and Industry to form the Ministry of Trade, Industry and Competition.

References

External links
 Department of Economic Development

Lists of political office-holders in South Africa